Gustav Schmidt (9 August 1926 – 29 December 2016) was a West German sprint canoeist, born in Duisburg, who competed in the 1950s. He won three medals at the ICF Canoe Sprint World Championships with two golds (K-4 1000 m and K-4 10000 m: both 1958) and a silver (K-2 1000 m: 1954). Schmidt also finished fourth in the K-2 1000 m event at the 1952 Summer Olympics in Helsinki.

References

 
 
Gustav Schmidt's obituary

External links
 
 

1926 births
2016 deaths
Sportspeople from Duisburg
Canoeists at the 1952 Summer Olympics
German male canoeists
Olympic canoeists of Germany
ICF Canoe Sprint World Championships medalists in kayak